Edward Daniel Hayden (December 27, 1833 – November 15, 1908) was a U.S. Representative from Massachusetts.

Born in Cambridge, Massachusetts, Hayden attended the Lawrence Academy, Groton, Massachusetts, and graduated from Harvard University in 1854.
He studied law.
He was admitted to the bar in 1857 and commenced practice in Woburn, Massachusetts.
He entered the United States Navy as assistant paymaster in 1861, and served in the Mississippi Squadron under Admiral Porter in the Vicksburg and Red River campaigns.
He returned to Woburn, Massachusetts, in 1866 and engaged in mercantile pursuits.
He served as president of the First National Bank 1874–1900.
He served as a member of the Massachusetts House of Representatives from 1880 to 1882.
Hayden was elected as a Republican to the Forty-ninth and Fiftieth Congresses (March 4, 1885 – March 3, 1889).
He was not a candidate for renomination in 1888.
He served as a delegate to the Republican National Convention in 1888.
He served for more than thirty years on the directorate of the Boston & Albany Railroad, and at the time of his death was vice president.
He served as a selectman and later as an alderman.
He served as a director of the Shawmut National Bank of Boston.
He died in Woburn, Massachusetts, November 15, 1908.
He was interred in Mount Auburn Cemetery, Cambridge, Massachusetts.

References

  Jeffries, B. J., News from the Classes 1854 The Harvard graduates' magazine Vol. XVII March 1909. No. 67.
[https://timesmachine.nytimes.com/timesmachine/1908/11/16/105014968.pdf New York Times, EDWARD D. HAYDEN DIES IN HIS PEW]; Vice President of the Boston & Albany Railroad Stricken with Apoplexy. EX-MEMBER OF CONGRESS Was Assistant Paymaster In the Navy, Serving in the Mississippi Squadron Under Admiral Porter  Page 9, (November 16, 1908).
Rand, John Clark, One of a Thousand A series of Biographical Sketches of One Thousand Representative Men Resident in the Commonwealth of Massachusetts. pages 293–294, (1890).

1833 births
1908 deaths
Harvard University alumni
Republican Party members of the Massachusetts House of Representatives
United States Navy officers
Burials at Mount Auburn Cemetery
American bank presidents
Republican Party members of the United States House of Representatives from Massachusetts
19th-century American politicians
19th-century American businesspeople